Waldemar Hartmann (born 10 March 1948 in Nürnberg) is a German sports journalist.

Life 
Hartmann worked since 1971 for German broadcaster Bayerischer Rundfunk (BR) and later for sport magazine Sportschau on German broadcaster ARD. Hartmann is married for a third time and lives in Chur, Switzerland. He has two children.

Works

References

External links 
 Official website by Waldemar Hartmann 

German sports journalists
German male journalists
German sports broadcasters
20th-century German journalists
21st-century German journalists
1948 births
Living people
German male writers
People from Chur
ARD (broadcaster) people
Bayerischer Rundfunk people